Arguin is an island off the western coast of Mauritania in the Bay of Arguin. The island is now part of the Banc d'Arguin National Park.

History 

The island changed hands frequently during the colonial era. The first European to visit the island was the Portuguese explorer Nuno Tristão, in 1443. In 1445, Prince Henry the Navigator set up a trading post on the island, which acquired gum arabic and slaves for Portugal. By 1455, 800 slaves were shipped from Arguin to Portugal every year.

In 1633, during its Dutch-Portuguese War, the Netherlands seized control of Arguin. It remained under Dutch rule until 1678, with a brief interruption by English rule in 1665. France took over the island in September 1678, but it was then abandoned until 1685. Arguin's aridity and its lack of a good anchorage made long-term European settlement difficult.

In 1685, Captain Cornelius Reers of the frigate  occupied the old Portuguese fort on the island. He successfully concluded a treaty with the native king in which Brandenburg was accepted as a protecting power. The treaty was ratified in 1687 and was renewed in 1698. Arguin remained a colony of Brandenburg until 1721 when the French successfully assaulted the fort and then took control of the island. The Dutch took the fort and island from the French the following year only to lose it again in 1724 to the French. This period of French rule lasted four years; in 1728, it reverted to the control of indigenous peoples.  The island was included in the territory of the French colony of Mauritania, and it remained under Mauritanian rule when that country became independent in 1960.

In July 1816, the French frigate Méduse, bound for Senegal, was wrecked off Arguin and 350 people died.

Sources 

Islands of Mauritania
Former Portuguese colonies
Former Dutch colonies
Former German colonies
1445 establishments in the Portuguese Empire
1633 disestablishments in the Portuguese Empire
1633 establishments in the Dutch Empire
1678 disestablishments in the Dutch Empire
1678 establishments in the French colonial empire
1685 disestablishments in the French colonial empire
1721 establishments in the French colonial empire
1722 disestablishments in the French colonial empire
1722 establishments in the Dutch Empire
1724 disestablishments in the Dutch Empire
1724 establishments in the French colonial empire
1728 disestablishments in the French colonial empire
1728 establishments in Africa
Brandenburg-Prussia
German colonial empire